Magdolna Patóh (born 12 May 1948) is a retired Hungarian freestyle swimmer who won a silver medal in the 4 × 100 m freestyle relay at the 1970 European Aquatics Championships. She competed in five events at the 1968 and 1972 Summer Olympics. Her best achievements were in the 4 × 100 m freestyle relay, where her team finished fifth and fourth in 1968 and 1972, respectively.

She graduated from a college of finance and accountancy. After retiring from senior swimming she competed in the masters category.

References

1948 births
Living people
Swimmers at the 1968 Summer Olympics
Swimmers at the 1972 Summer Olympics
Olympic swimmers of Hungary
Hungarians in Slovakia
European Aquatics Championships medalists in swimming
Hungarian female freestyle swimmers